Cookie Jar Toons (also known as This Is for Kids) was a daily children's programming block on the This TV digital broadcast network when that network was partially owned by the former Weigel Broadcasting (7 years later, the network was acquired by Allen Media Group). The block was programmed by Canada-based DHX Media (formerly Cookie Jar Entertainment and today as WildBrain).

The block used the name Cookie Jar Toons for E/I programs, and the name This Is for Kids for non-E/I programs. Many of animated and live action shows where broadcast on the block were Cookie Jar archive programs from predecessors DIC and Cinar, though some (i.e.: Mona the Vampire) had never been seen in the United States before; other programs (i.e.: Sonic Underground) were previously seen on other American networks.

On November 1, 2013, Tribune Broadcasting took over Weigel's half-ownership of This TV, causing the weekday lineup to be replaced with more airings of films, while the weekend block was reduced to Sunday mornings and, due to the basic three-hour minimum required to meet E/I guidelines without any non-E/I content, it was replaced with double airings of three live-action series from Bellum Entertainment; Animal Atlas, Zoo Clues, and On the Spot, which have no specific branding or continuity.

Programming
E/I Indicates program features content in line with FCC E/I programming guidelines.

Launch programming

2009 additions

2010 additions

2011 additions

2012 additions

See also
 Cookie Jar Kids Network (Cookie Jar's former syndicated children's block)
 Cookie Jar TV (Cookie Jar's former Saturday morning children's block on CBS)
 KidsClick (A children's block from Sinclair Broadcast Group that also aired on This TV)

References

Television programming blocks
This TV
WildBrain